David Arthur Evans (February 10, 1915 - December 14, 1989) was a Canadian politician, who represented the electoral district of Simcoe Centre in the Legislative Assembly of Ontario from 1960 to 1977 as a Conservative member.

Background
Evans was a salesman who owned a restaurant, a bakery, a clothing store and an apartment building. He was married to Audrey Myrtle Kerr (Died April 29, 1981), they had 4 children.  Later to Eileen Alfreda Dixon, daughter of Roy Alfred Dixon and Beatrice Louisa Crumbie.

Politics
Evans was Mayor of Bradford, Ontario and Warden of Simcoe County. In 1960 he was elected to the Legislative Assembly of Ontario in a by-election. He was re-elected in the elections in 1963, 1967, 1971  and 1975. He served as Parliamentary Assistant to the Minister of Energy (1974) and to the Minister of Transportation and Communications. He retired from politics in 1977.

References

External links 
 

1915 births
1989 deaths
Progressive Conservative Party of Ontario MPPs